Andrew David Douglas Harris (born 26 February 1977) is a former footballer who spent his whole playing career in England. He previously played in The Football League for Southend United, Leyton Orient and Chester City, he is also a firm fans favourite at former conference side Weymouth, where during their title winning season he scored a memorable second half equaliser against Nottingham Forest at The City Ground. He now coaches youth football side Weymouth Cougars.

Early life
He was born in Springs in South Africa.

Playing career
Harris began with Liverpool but failed to make a first–team appearance at Anfield before he moved to Southend United in July 1996. After three years with the Shrimpers, Harris switched to Leyton Orient ahead of 1998–99. His four-year stint with Orient included an appearance at the Millennium Stadium against Blackpool in the Football League Division Three play–off final in May 2001. Despite being a near ever–present in his last three seasons with the club, Harris was released at the end of 2002–03 and joined Chester City on a free transfer, being described as a "major signing" by manager Mark Wright.

However, Harris was to start just 19 league games in two years at the club, the first ending with the club finishing as champions of the Conference National. His second season included a loan spell with Forest Green Rovers and ended with him joining Weymouth. During the 2005–06 season, Harris scored a shock equaliser for Weymouth in an FA Cup tie at Nottingham Forest and helped them win the Conference South championship. But he did not feature again after knee surgery and he dropped back into the Conference South with Eastleigh, with a loan move quickly becoming a permanent transfer on 10 October 2006.

On 26 May 2009 he moved back to Weymouth for their 2009–10 season in the Conference South. He retired in June 2010.

As Weymouth are a part-time club now, Harris has Moved into teaching and teaches a National Football Studies Course at Kingston Maurward College in Dorset.

Away from football, Harris is a member of Mensa International, possessing an IQ of 153. He appeared on the ITV1 programme, Britain's Brainiest Footballers, in 2002.

References

External links
 
 Southend United career stats
 Eastleigh FC player profile

1977 births
English footballers
Association football midfielders
Living people
People from Springs, Gauteng
English Football League players
National League (English football) players
Liverpool F.C. players
Southend United F.C. players
Leyton Orient F.C. players
Chester City F.C. players
Forest Green Rovers F.C. players
Weymouth F.C. players
Eastleigh F.C. players
Mensans
Sportspeople from Gauteng
English football managers
Weymouth F.C. managers